Joseph Vaz (Konkani: San Zuze Vaza; ;  Pavitra Yoseph Vaz Santaru;  Punitha Sūsai Munivar;  Santha Juse Vas Munithuma, Sri Lankawe Aposthuluvaraya) (21 April 165116 January 1711) was an Oratorian priest and missionary in Sri Lanka (Ceylon), originally from Sancoale in Portuguese India.

Vaz arrived in Ceylon during the Dutch occupation, when the Dutch were imposing Calvinism as the official religion after taking over from the Portuguese Empire. He travelled throughout the island bringing the Eucharist and the Sacraments to clandestine groups of crypto-Catholics. Later in his mission, he found shelter in the Kingdom of Kandy where he was able to work freely. By the time of his death, Vaz had managed to rebuild the Catholic Church on the island.

As a result of his labors, Vaz is known as the Apostle of Ceylon. On 21 January 1995, he was beatified by Pope John Paul II in Colombo. He was canonized on 14 January 2015 by Pope Francis in an open-air Mass ceremony at the Galle Face Green in Colombo.

Early life
The third of six children, Vaz was born in 1651 at Benaulim, his mother's village in Goa, then known as Portuguese India, part of the Portuguese Empire. His parents, Cristóvão Vaz and Maria de Miranda, were devout Catholics. Cristóvão belonged to a prominent Naik family of Sancoale. He was baptised on the eighth day at the Parish Church of St. John the Baptist, Benaulim by its pastor, Jacinto Pereira.

Vaz attended the elementary school in Sancoale. He learned Portuguese in Sancoale and Latin in Benaulim. He was a bright pupil and respected by his teachers and fellow students. He made such rapid progress in his studies that his father decided to send him to the city of Velha Goa for further studies; where he did a course in rhetoric and humanities at the Jesuit college of St. Paul. He further studied philosophy and theology at the St. Thomas Aquinas' Academy of the Dominicans.

In 1675, Vaz was ordained a deacon for the Archdiocese of Goa by Custódio de Pinho, the Vicar Apostolic of Bijapur and Golconda. In 1676, he was ordained a priest by the Archbishop of Goa, António Brandão, S.O.Cist. Soon after his ordination, he started going barefoot to live like the poor and acquired a reputation as a popular preacher and confessor. He opened a Latin school in Sancoale for prospective seminarians. In 1677 he consecrated himself as a "slave of Mary", sealing it with a document known as the "Deed of Bondage".

Ministry in Canara (1681–1684)
Vaz wanted to serve as a missionary in Ceylon, and therefore presented his request to go there to the cathedral chapter, which was administering the diocese following the vacancy created by the death of Brandão on 6 July 1678. However, the cathedral chapter proposed to him to go to Canara instead, where the Padroado authorities in Goa were in conflict with the local authorities belonging to the Sacred Congregation of Propaganda Fide, the Vatican agency for missionary efforts worldwide. Vaz was appointed the Vicar Forane of Canara by the Padroado in 1681, and sent with the purpose of asserting their jurisdiction against the Propaganda Fide. The chapter also gave him the esteemed title of "Frame of Canara". Upon his arrival, he found the situation of the Roman Catholic Church there to be highly explosive.

The Padroado authorities in Goa were at conflict with those of the Propaganda Fide in Canara, led by the already incumbent Vicar Forane, Bishop Thomas de Castro. The source of the conflict was that De Castro's appointment as Vicar Forane of Canara by Pope Clement X on 30 August 1675 was not recognised by the preceding Padroado archbishop. Consequently, they did not cede the jurisdiction to him despite the pope's letter of appointment.

The Padroado–Propaganda conflict which ensued divided the Catholics of Canara into two sides—those who recognised the authority of the Padroado archbishop in Goa versus those who supported De Castro. Those who recognised the authority of the Padroado were excommunicated by De Castro, while those who recognised the authority of the Propaganda were excommunicated by the Padroado authorities at Goa. Both groups were forbidden from receiving sacraments from the priests of the rival group, on penalty of excommunication.

In a letter dated 14 September 1681, Vaz lamented:"Many in fact believe that the Catholic Church is divided, and that we and the Bishop's priests are not children of the same Mother Church; and that our doctrines and our sacraments are different; and what the ones do, the others destroy. Thus the Catholic Church is much despised and is not acceptable."

With great diplomacy and humility, Vaz met De Castro at Mangalore and after having convinced himself of the legitimacy of the documents, brought about a truce until a direction was received from the new pope, Innocent XI. In light of the fact that the bishop had legitimate authority, Vaz recognised his authority and while continuing to adhere to the Padroado system, zealously worked for the religious welfare of the people. The bishop further agreed to delegate jurisdiction to him conditionally. Vaz often spoke to him and pleaded with him not to issue so many excommunications, but to wait for a final decision from the pope. He pointed out that the Hindus were scandalised and the Christians bewildered by these arguments.

During his stay, Vaz undertook serious missionary activities in Canara from 1681 to 1684, carrying out a lot of missionary work in Mangalore, Coondapur, Basroor, Barcoor, Moolki, Kallianpur and other areas, and reviving the spirits and faith of the widely scattered Roman Catholic community. He reconstructed the Rosario Cathedral in Mangalore and built new churches at Onore, Basroor, Cundapore, and Gangolim. He also set up small schools in some of the villages with the co-operation of their residents.

Vaz's most important contribution, however, was the establishment of a large number of Irmidades (Confraternities) throughout Canara, where he would periodically celebrate festive occasions with great pomp. Vaz was compelled to do so due to a shortage of priests, and as such an Irmidade brought together the Catholics of a place where there was no church or resident priest. To this end, he constructed small huts and asked the local Catholics to gather there and recite their prayers. This greatly helped to keep alive and encourage the religious fervor for Christianity.

In his short stay, Vaz acquired a great and saintly reputation. He did yeoman service to the cause of the upliftment of the downtrodden. Many miracles are attributed to him. A local legend has it that while serving as parish priest of Our Lady of Mercy parish, Paneer, a few kilometres from Mudipu, Bantwal, a few Hindus arrived in the night, asking him to accompany them to administer final sacraments to a sick parishioner in the neighbourhood of Mudipu.

The men had conspired to slay the priest, due to his tireless missionary activities. When they reached the top of the Hill, the men tried to kill him. The serene Vaz knelt down on the rock and held his stick straight on the ground. A light flashed in their midst and the men could see water gushing from the spots where he knelt. Owing to this miracle, the men fled from the scene and Vaz returned to the parish unharmed. A shrine dedicated to him was constructed at that very site at Mudipu. It is visited annually by thousands of pilgrims and devotees, seeking blessings and cures for various ailments.

The new archbishop, Manuel de Sousa e Menezes, arrived in Goa and was displeased with Vaz on account of the agreement he had made with De Castro. When Vaz sought permission to return to Goa, the request was refused by the archbishop. After the archbishop's death in 1684, however, the cathedral chapter of Goa allowed him to return to Goa, replacing him with Nicholas de Gamhoa, one of his former assistants.

Oratorian
When Vaz returned to Goa, he spent his time preaching in the surrounding villages. He also joined a group of priests of the archdiocese who had decided to live together in a religious community. The group was formally erected as a community of the Congregation of the Oratory of St. Philip Neri on 25 September 1685, the first native religious community in the diocese. They took charge of the Church of the Holy Cross of Miracles, where they established their residence. Vaz was elected first provost of the community.

Sri Lanka mission (1687–1711)
Hearing of the distressful situation of the Catholics of Ceylon who reportedly had no priests for many years, Vaz desired to go to their rescue. But instead he was named Superior of the Canara Mission, a post which he occupied for three years. In 1686, Vaz obtained permission to give up this office and to proceed to Ceylon. He stopped in the Keladi Kingdom in 1686–1687 for a few months on his way to Ceylon, where helped by his companions, he attended to the spiritual needs of the local Christians. Disguised as a mendicant, he reached the port of Tuticorin on Easter Sunday 1687.

Mannar
Joseph Vaz and his servant John embarked, with great trepidation as, in keeping with their disguise as labourers, they carried no baggage and the sacred vessels for Mass and an altar stone were concealed about their person. At that time the journey took 3 or 4 days and never more than a week but a very severe storm which burst soon after the ship put to sea delayed its progress and compelled the Captain to take shelter in Mannar. As Joseph Vaz and his servant did not have a stock of foodstuffs and therefore depended on the charity of their fellow passengers who were themselves in short supply, they were put on shore in a state of exhaustion, famished, thirsty and penniless. They remained in the town of Mannar for some days begging from door to door and as soon as they regained sufficient strength sailed for Jaffna on the strength of the passports issued to them at Tuticorin. As they had embarked from Mannar they escaped all scrutiny on arrival at Jaffna.

Jaffna mission
On landing at Jaffna, Vaz found a strong Calvinist presence.  As Catholic priests were banned by the Dutch authorities, he had to travel under the guise of a mendicant and to work in secret. He travelled barefoot as an Indian sanyasi.

Vaz suffered from acute dysentery, contracted from the terrible travelling conditions. Upon recovering, he began contacting Catholics and hiding from the Dutch. He was taken in and ministered to his secret flock by night. In 1689, taking up his residence in a village called Sillalai where the Catholics were numerous and resolute, Vaz succeeded in reviving the spirit of the faithful. In 1690, he was forced to change his quarters for Puttalam, where he worked with great success for a whole year. Portuguese or Portuguese creole was the common language of the local Catholic communities those days -as it was the case till recently among Burghers- so communication was not a problem for padre José Vaz.

Jaffna - his illness
After many unsuccessful attempts Joseph Vaz and his faithful companion found shelter for the night in an empty shed in the suburbs of the town. As a result of the very severe hardships undergone by him during his journey from Tuticorin, Joseph Vaz found himself unable to sit up the following morning. So John had to go about begging for some nourishment for his master. Before long it was found that he was suffering from acute dysentery. As soon as this became known to the neighbours, they carried him away in a rough litter to a lonely spot in the open and left him there to be tended by his servant. John nursed his master for some time but very soon he himself contracted the disease and was forced to lie down by his master's side. The sight of these two strangers lying ill and helpless moved the heart of a woman, who happened to pass by, to such an extent that she brought them every day a cup of rice . Not long afterwards both master and servant were on their feet again.

Jaffna - after illness
When Joseph Vaz regained his health sufficiently to start begging from house to house in the town of Jaffna he also tried to identify the houses where Catholics lived. This was no easy matter as no Catholic dared to use a rosary, a cross or a medal publicly and there was no picture, image or crucifix to be seen anywhere. He therefore adopted the expedient of wearing a large rosary round his neck and observing the effects of this emblem of the Catholic faith on the inmates of the houses at which he begged for alms. Within a few days he spotted several houses where he received sympathy and generosity but there was one particular house where his visits were always welcome. One day when he met the master of the house he asked whether the gentleman would like to see a priest and receive the sacraments. This led the man to think over the implications of the question and he consulted a Catholic citizen of means and of influence who was highly respected even by the Dutch. The latter took it upon himself to go in search of the beggar and find out the facts by direct inquiry. On being asked point blank whether he was a priest and if so to own it as he was in a position to offer shelter in his own house with perfect safety, Joseph Vaz showed him the credential letter empowering him to exercise his priestly ministry. Straightaway he conducted Vaz and his servant John to his house.

Sillalai
After some time townsfolk of Jaffna who had benefited from the ministrations of Vaz feared that news of his presence might leak out somehow and decided to remove him to a village in the outskirts in which the Catholics would safeguard him. As soon as this decision was made known to them, a trusty bodyguard from Sillalai went to Jaffna and conducted Vaz under cover of darkness to their village. Sillalai which was then entirely Catholic later came to be known as "Little Rome". Because of its smallness and relative unimportance, Sillalai had escaped the attentions of the Dutch; and it was able to preserve the faith intact because it had continued the system of appointing a Catechist to look after the Chapel, baptise the new-born, instruct the young, bury the dead and in the case of disputes act as an Arbitrator. When Vaz came to know of this organization, he adopted it and established it in every Catholic village and the institution has come down to the present time in Catholic villages, where there is no resident priest, the Catechist being now known as the Muhuppu.
Vaz made Sillalai his headquarters and for more than two years at a stretch he ministered to those in Sillalai and the neighbouring villages, going out after nightfall and returning before dawn invariably with a safe escort. When his presence became known through a Judas on one occasion and a news leak on another occasion, soldiers were sent to apprehend him but on both occasions he managed to evade them. However, when he saw that owing to his presence the leading Catholics of Jaffna had to suffer a great deal by way of confiscation of property, imprisonment for life, and flogging, he had himself and John conveyed safely firstly to the Vanni and later to Puttalam which was in the domain of the King of Kandy.

Puttalam
This town was then inhabited by a large number of Catholics but although they had a church of their own and were free to profess their religion there had been no Mass or Sacraments or adequate instruction for over 36 years owing to the absence of priests. Consequently there had been much neglect but they had kept their faith. St.Joseph Vaz first ministered to them and thereafter went from village to village in the Seven Korales preaching, administering the Sacraments, re-building churches and appointing catechists. After 18 months he left for Kandy with a trader from Veueda who was returning home with a stock of merchandise.

Veuda
This place was the gateway to Kandy and as all strangers had to obtain the king's authority before proceeding to the royal city, Vaz waited there until authority was obtained by the trader. Meanwhile he spent his time ministering to the needs of the Catholics. When this became known to one Lanerolle, a Frenchman who was violently anti-Catholic, he denounced Vaz as a Portuguese spy and the king ordered that he be arrested and brought in chains to Kandy.

Kandy
Vaz was thereafter imprisoned and kept under very close observation so that his actions may be reported to the King Vimaladharmasurya II. When the king was satisfied that he was a harmless person who spent most of his time in religious devotions and that John was really his servant, he ordered that they be placed in house detention with strict injunctions that they should not leave the premises. Vaz made use of his enforced inactivity to study the Sinhala language. After some time John and he put up a rough shed with an altar and a wooden cross and prayed therein, on their knees, morning, noon and night within sight of the public. On Christmas night of 1691 he said Mass for the first time in Kandy and as no objection was raised by anyone he continued to do so thereafter, regularly. When this news spread, one Catholic after another obtained the King's permission to meet him for the Sacraments and Mass. After some time the King permitted him to leave the premises but ordered that he should never cross the river that surrounded the city. Concurrently with this relaxation he got the Catholics to build a church to replace the shed put up by him and on 2 September 1692 he requested his Congregation in Goa to send priests to assist him. From that time onwards he openly ministered to the Catholics in the town and to those who came from the villages. Whenever he received a message that a Catholic was sick or dying beyond the river, he did not hesitate to go despite the prohibition and it is to the credit of those whose business it was to see that the prohibition was observed that they never reported these infringements owing to his repute as a very holy man.

Miraculous Shower of Rain
There was at this time a very prolonged drought in Kandy and the customary ceremonies for rain had been performed without avail. Thereupon the King, Vimaladharma Surya, sent some of his Catholic courtiers to Vaz inviting him to pray for rain. Realising that this was more or less a challenge to test his powers of intercession with God, he sent back word that if the king had faith and if it was to the glory of God rain would assuredly come down; and he set up an altar in the public square opposite to the Palace, placed a cross thereon, and prayed to God to glorify His Name by sending down rain. Before he rose from his knees, rain fell in abundance but not a drop fell on him. This was the turning point in the religious vocation of Vaz, for the king thereafter gave him personal privileges never accorded to any others. Privileges included the liberty to preach anywhere, not only in his dominion but also to go beyond the border and visit the Dutch towns as often as he pleased. Besides giving a fillip to those of the faith it brought about, for the first time, many conversions from among the people of Kandy took place.

Kandyan Villages
His position in Kandy being now secure through the benevolence of the king, Vaz decided to make it his headquarters and sally forth into different parts of the island from time to time, but before doing so he dispatched John to Goa to explain verbally the circumstances in the island and the urgent need of priests. Thereafter he went by himself to the Catholic villages of the Kandyan Kingdom namely to Sitawaka, Ruwanwella, Kendangamuwa and Ratnapura. At each place he ministered to the Catholics, got a Chapel erected, and appointed a Muhuppu or an Annavi or both to keep up the faith in the absence of a priest. Then in order to enter Dutch territory with safety he put aside his cassock and assumed a disguise, probably that of a beggar as it suited him best; besides, owing to his knowledge of both Sinhala and Tamil, he could easily pass off as a beggar.

Kandy mission
In 1692, Vaz settled in Kandy, the capital of the independent Kingdom of Kandy, as his centre of operations. On his arrival, he was deemed to be a Portuguese spy and was imprisoned with two other Catholics. There he learned Sinhala, the local language. They were left alone by the prison guards as long as they didn't try to escape and he built a hut-church and later a proper church dedicated to Our Lady, and began converting other prisoners.

Making the most of his new-found freedom, Vaz made a mission visit to the Dutch-controlled areas and visited Catholics in Colombo. Three missionaries from the Oratory of Goa arrived in 1697 to help him, with the news that Pedro Pacheco, Bishop of Cochin, had appointed Vaz as Vicar General in Ceylon. He was organising the basic mission structure when smallpox broke out in Kandy. His work with the sick convinced the king to allow Vaz freedom in his labours.

Vaz carried his mission to the main centres of the island. Between 1687 and 1711, he was at the head of a group of Goan Bamonn priests who under his leadership and inspiration, mixed and moved about under cover sustaining the persecuted Roman Catholic population in Ceylon.

Vaz returned to Kandy in 1699 with a fellow priest, Joseph de Carvalho, who had been expelled at the instigation of Buddhist monks. He completed the construction of his new church, and went into service for the king, translating Portuguese books into Sinhala. From this vantage point, Vaz intensified his ministry, and converted some Sinhalese notables. New missionaries arrived in 1705, which enabled him to organise the mission into eight districts, each led by a priest. He worked on the creation of Catholic literature comparable to that of the Buddhists, and to affirm the rights of Catholics with those of the Dutch Calvinist Government. He was assisted by Jacome Gonsalves. Vaz humbly declined the offer made to him in 1705, to be the bishop and first Vicar Apostolic of Ceylon, preferring to remain a simple missionary. For this reason, he is often depicted with a mitre beside him.

Smallpox in Kandy 
Towards the middle of 1697 when Vaz returned to Kandy from a visit to Colombo he found a violent outbreak of smallpox in the city. This is a highly infectious disease and looked up in Sri Lanka as a dreaded disease. The first sufferers, mostly slaves and beggars, had been removed and left to die in deserted spots and jungles. Dead bodies were thus found in forests and even on the road sides, thereby, spreading the disease. St.Joseph Vaz and his nephew sought out those abandoned in the woods, accommodated them in huts erected for the purpose, and tended them twice a day carrying food, medicine and clothing collected by them. Each time they washed the patient, cleansed his pustules, administered medicines, fed and clothed him and cleaned up the place, rendering the most menial services for which no persons could be found anywhere either for money or for love. Later, as the work increased, some devout Catholics assisted them. When the number of cases multiplied greatly the King and his Court left the city. The Chiefs and the well-to-do also did the same. Even the common people left as soon as a family member or a neighbour fell a victim to the disease. Before long the city was almost deserted. St.Joseph Vaz then went from house to house attending to the abandoned patients in their own homes, and he accommodated the others in vacant houses close to the church which he rented out one by one until there were altogether four such houses full of patients. When this became known every patient sought the aid of the two priests who treated all patients alike irrespective of their race or creed and brought to the hospital the homeless, the abandoned and the helpless. Very often the patients were moved to tears and could scarcely believe what they saw with their own eyes. Eventually the patients overcame the fear of public opinion which has been the greatest obstacle to the spread of the Catholic faith in Sri Lanka and many of them begged St.Joseph Vaz to receive them into the religion of the God who taught such manner of charity and gave him the strength and courage to practice it in such circumstances. Thus, there were many conversions both among those who died and those who survived. When at the height of the pestilence there were as many as 10 to 12 deaths a day and sufficient men were not available for the work, the two priests had often to dress the corpses, carry the coffins, dig the graves and bury the dead with their own hands. When the dead happened to be persons baptized during their illness the Catholics followed the funeral procession at St.Joseph Vaz's request. It took 12 months for the smallpox epidemic to abate in Kandy and the King openly declared that were it not for Vaz's charity, the streets would have been full of corpses.

Hanwella
The first Portuguese town visited by Vaz was Hanwella. He found that the descendants of the Portuguese and the local people who were Catholics were strong in their faith. So after administering the sacraments to them, he proceeded on his way to Colombo.

Malwana
The next place visited by Vaz was Malwana. It was then a very important post, and had a church. The Catholic population was faithful, so he did not have to tarry long here.

Colombo
Most of the Catholics were in the Pettah named Old City, so Vaz had no need to enter the Fort or The Castle as it was called, where there were very few Catholics. The number and influence of the Catholics in the Pettaha enabled Vaz to remain for some time, unknown to the Dutch, in different parts of the city and in the suburbs to carry out his ministry by night and to make several conversions. By the time his presence became known and arrangements were made to hunt him Vaz was safely on his way to Negambo.

Negombo
Here, there was a very large Catholic population who could not be easily tamed by persecution then or afterwards. The chief Catholic who was in the service of the Dutch but was greatly respected by the king of Kandy was the Mudaliyar of Negambo. He was in consequence appointed Muhuppu. Due to his influence and that of other Catholics Vaz was able to increase the fervour of the Catholic population. Thereafter he returned to Kandy to find that a young Kandyan nobleman was waiting to be instructed and baptized by him. Shortly afterwards he left for Puttalam and thence to Mantota.

Manthota
This was an important Catholic village situated in the centre of a large Catholic population scattered over the district and extending to the Vanni. He ministered for some time, caused chapels to be set up, and Muhuppus and Annavis to be appointed before making his way to Jaffna, which he was re-visiting after an absence of four years. During this period he had visited practically the whole of the west coast of Sri Lanka from Jaffna to Colombo which area was then as it is now the most Catholic part of Sri Lanka.

Punarim, Kottiyar, Trincomalee, Batticaloa & Sammanturai 
Before returning to Kandy Vaz visited all these places and at the last four places which belonged to the King of Kandy he set up chapels. During these first visits he limited himself to administering the Sacraments to the Catholics who had retained their faith. On his return to Kandy he had the most welcome news that his Congregation in Goa had sent two priests and that they had already arrived at Puttalam. They were Joseph de Menezes and his own nephew Joseph Carvalho who had been his constant companion in Kanara. So he rushed down to Puttalam to welcome them.

Crossing the Flooded Deduru Oya on Foot 
On the way to Puttalam he had to wade across the Deduru Oya but due to floods it could not be crossed on foot; and several parties of merchants had been waiting for several days until the floods subsided. With a prayer on his lips and confidence in his heart he stepped into the rushing waters with staff in hand and bade his companions to follow him, to the great amusement of the onlookers. He advanced to the middle of the river without mishap and halting there asked his attendants to go across without fear. They did so along with some other travellers and reached the other side safely while Vaz waited till all had crossed and followed only then.

Batticaloa mission
Joseph Vaz visited Batticaloa in 1710 in order to revive the Catholic faith during the time of Dutch persecution against Catholics. He visited a church in Thandavenveli, now known as Church of Our Lady of Presentation, where he was tied to a tree and beaten. Again, he made a second visit to Batticaloa for reviving the Catholic faith and returned to Kandy.

Death
King Vimaldharna Surya II, Vaz's patron, died in 1707, but Vira Narendra Sinha, his successor, proved to be an even greater supporter. New missionaries arrived in 1708. In 1710, despite health problems, Vaz took another apostolic trip. On his return, he fell ill. He recovered from a series of infections and fevers, but was left weakened. He undertook eight days of spiritual exercises prescribed by the Oratorian Rule, but before the seventh day he died at Kandy on 16 January 1711, aged 59.

Vaz's work was carried forward by Jacome Gonsalves.

Veneration
The subject of his beatification was first urged upon the consideration of the Holy See about 1737 by Francisco de Vasconcellos, Bishop of Cochin, who also claimed jurisdiction over Ceylon. The process was begun in Goa, and a number of miracles were registered. But the non-fulfilment of certain essential formalities led Pope Benedict XIV to cancel the proceedings, with an order, however, that they should be re-instituted.  The Apostolic Delegate of the East Indies, Ladislaus Zaleski (1852–1925), who was resident in Kandy, kept hearing reports. He was a great admirer of Joseph Vaz, did his own research, and published a multi-issued biography of him.

The formal process was resumed later and completed in 1953 by the Archdiocese of Goa and Daman. On 21 January 1995, he was beatified by Pope John Paul II in Colombo, Sri Lanka.

In October 2013, a Diocesan Inquiry of a miracle attributed to Vaz took place. In November 2013, Patriarch Filipe Neri Ferrao stated that the cause for Vaz's canonisation had reached a 'crucial stage'. The pope approved the vote by the Ordinary Session of Cardinals and Bishops in favor of canonization of the Indian-born priest and decided to summon a consistory shortly after.

Pope Francis waived the requirement for a second miracle, generally a requirement for canonization. The pope used the same process he used to canonize Pope John XXIII—without a second miracle attributed to his intercession.
 
Joseph Vaz was canonized by Pope Francis on 14 January 2015 in Colombo at Galleface, Sri Lanka. Joseph Vaz is the first saint to have been canonised in Sri Lanka, the first saint of Sri Lanka (having died there) and first originally from the area of Goa, India.

The canonization of Joseph Vaz was celebrated at the St Joseph Vaz Shrine, Mudipu, Mangalore, during 14–16 January 2015, as he was the first priest from the Konkan Coast to be canonized.

Legacy
So far the only school named in honor of Vaz is the Joseph Vaz College of Wennappuwa, Sri Lanka, which was founded in January 1935 by the Marist Brothers (initiated 1933).

In the state of Goa there is a school, at Sancoale as well as a science college in Cortalim named St. Joseph Vaz.

In Karnataka, there is a parish dedicated to Vaz in Mudipu and in Sri Lanka, there is a chapel under his patronage in a remote village called Aluthwewa, about 10 miles off Galewela, in the Parish of Wahakotte. There is a small community of Christians who are migrant farmers from Wahakotte there who brought the devotion to him.

British Labour MP Keith Vaz, the Parliament's longest-serving Asian member, is a distant relative of Joseph.

References

 Vida do Venerable Jose Vaz- Rev. Fr. Sebastian do Rego, 1747
 Life of Blessed Joseph Vaz, Apostle of Sri Lanka – Rev. Fr. S.G. Perera ( S.J.) 1942
 History of the Miracles Cross of Old Goa – Rev. Fr. John Perira(S.F.X) 1982
 Life & Achievements of Blessed Joseph Vaz- Rev. Fr. Cosme Jose Costa 1996 (S.F.X) 1982
 The Dutch Period volume 1 – Rev. Fr. V. Perniola (S.J.)
 The Dutch Period volume 11 – Rev. Fr. V. Perniola (S.J.)
 A Glistening wake of the Life of Venerable Fr. Joseph Vaz- Rev. Fr. Jos Claude Lawrence (O.M.I.)1981
 The Sanciticity of Father Joseph Vaz –Rev. Fr. W.L.A. Don Peter, 1990
 Though Storm & Tempest a Biography of Blessed Joseph Vaz- Rev. Fr. Michael Mascarenhas (S.D.B.) 2001
 The Apostle of Ceylon – Most Rev. Dr. Mons. L.M. Zaleski (1897)
 Life of Ven. Fr. Joseph Vaz – Rev. Fr. Phip Caspersz ( O.S.B.)
 Historical Sketches - Rev. Fr. S.G. Perera ( S.J.)
 Oratorian Mission- Rev. Fr. S.G. Perera ( S.J.)
 Positio, Sacra Congregatio pro Sanctorum Officium Historiu Beatificationis in Canonizationis Servi Dei IOSEPH VAZ- Fr. Joe Quintus Perera, 1985
 Ven. Fr. Joseph Vaz – Rev. Fr. Pio Ciampa ( S.J.)
 To the Rescue of Sri Lanka – Rev. Fr. Joseph Aloysius (O.M.I.)
 Studies in Ceylon Church History –Rev. Fr. W.L.A. Don Peter
 Blessed Joseph Vaz, The Man, His Mission , His Message –Rev. Fr. Denis G. Pereira
 St. Anne’s of Talavila – Most Rev. Dr. Edmund Peiris (O.M.I.)
 The Story of the Rosary in Ceylon – Rev. Fr. S. Thommanupillai (O.M.I.),1958
 207 Stories of Blessed Joseph Vaz– Rev. Fr. Romualdo Robin Rodrigues – (2005)
 Blessed Joseph Vaz- A Creative Missionary A Head of His Time - Rev. Fr. Manuel Gomes (2010)
 Letters of  Blessed Joseph Vaz – Son of Goa, Apostle of Sri Lanka & Canara- Rev. Fr. Cosme Jose Costa 1996 (S.F.X) 2011
 Star in the East -–Rev. Fr. W.L.A. Don Peter, 1995
 Joseph Vaz – India’s First & Greatest Missionary – R. H. Lesser 1992
 Joseph Vaz, Apostle of Sri Lanka – Jean Olwen Maynard ,2001
 The Apostle of Ceylon- Tr Ambrose Cator 1913
 A Saint for the New India – Charles Gasbarri, 1961

Bibliography

Primary
Letters of Blessed Joseph Vaz: Son of Goa, Apostle of Canara and Sri Lanka. Ed. Cosme Jose Vaz Costa. Goa: Eremito M. Rebelo, 2011.

Secondary
Mascarenhas, Michael, SDB. Through Storm and Tempest: A Biography of Blessed Joseph Vaz, Apostle of Canara and Sri Lanka (1651–1711) and an Account of the Historic Exploits of the First Oratorians (Goa...) in Sri Lanka. Mumbai: Tej-prasarini Don Bosco Communications, 2001.
Mascarenhas, Michael, SDB. Bhaktivant Jose Vazachem Caritravarnan: Kanara and Sri Lankecho preshit (1651–1711) ani Goemcya pratham Oratorian Sansthen Sri Lankat kel'lea caritrik missao vavracho vivar. Tr. into Konkani (Kannada script) by Reginald Pinto, Santosh Menezes, OFM Cap. and Victor Rodrigues. Mumbai: Tej-prasarini Don Bosco Communications, 2002.
Mascarenhas, Michael, SDB. Vadoll ani tufananantlean: Goencho bhagevont put Padri Juze Vazachea jivitachi kotha. Translation into Konkani (Roman script) by Thomas Misquith and Jess Fernandes. Panjim: Boskon Communications, 2010.
Mascarenhas, Michael, SDB. Vadalvara va tufanatun: Dhanyavadit Joseph Vaz yanche jivan caritra. Translation into Marathi by Anil Dabre. Mumbai: Tej-prasarini Don Bosco Communications, 2006.
Cabral e Sa, Mario, and Lourdes Bravo da Costa Rodrigues, Great Goans. Vol. 1: Abbe Faria, Fr Jose Vaz, Lata Mangeshkar, T.B. Cunha. N.N.A.P. Publications, 1986.
Don Peter, W.L.A. Studies in Ceylon Church History. Colombo: Catholic Press, 1963.
Don Peter, W.L.A. Historical Gleanings. Colombo, n.p., 1992.
Gomes, Manuel. Blessed Joseph Vaz: A Creative Missionary Ahead of His Time. Old Goa: Manuel P. Gomes, Pastoral Institute St Pius X, 2010.
Goonetileke, H.A.I. A Bibliography of Ceylon. 5 vols. Zug: Switzerland, 1975–1983.
Pereira, Denis G. Blessed Joseph Vaz, the Man, His Mission, His Message. Bopmbay: Pauline, c. 1996.
Perera, S.G. Life of Blessed Joseph Vaz: Apostle of Sri Lanka. Ontario: Humanics Universal Inc., 2011. [Reprinted in Goa by Eremito M. Rebelo.]
Perera, S.G., ed. The Oratorian Mission in Ceylon: Historical Documents relating to the Life and Labours of the Venerable Father Joseph Vaz, his Companions and Successors. Colombo: Caxton Printing Works, 1936.
Perniola, V. The Catholic Church in Sri Lanka: The Dutch Period. 2 vols. Dehiwala: Tissara Prakasakayo, 1983.
Perniola, V., tr. The Catholic Church in Sri Lanka. The Portuguese Period: Original Documents. Ceylon Historical Journal monograph series 15–16. Dehiwala: Tissara Prakasakayo 1989–(1991). [1:77.]
Wickremasinghe, Martin. Landmarks of Sinhalese Literature. Colombo: Gunasena, 1948/1963.
Gomes, Luis. Boddvo Iadnik.
Costa, Cosme. A letter from Joseph Vaz.
Do Rego, Sebastiao. Vida do Veneravel Padre Jose Vaz.

External links
 Catholic Encyclopedia: Blessed Joseph Vaz
 Saints.SQPN.com: Saint Joseph Vaz
 Blessed Joseph Vaz – Apostle of Sri Lanka

1651 births
1711 deaths
Scholars from Goa
People from Benaulim
Goan Catholics
Indian Roman Catholic priests
17th-century Portuguese Roman Catholic priests
18th-century Portuguese Roman Catholic priests
Oratorians
Roman Catholic missionaries in Sri Lanka
Indian Roman Catholic missionaries
Oratorian saints
Beatifications by Pope John Paul II
Canonizations by Pope Francis
Indian Roman Catholic saints
Portuguese Roman Catholic saints
Venerated Catholics by Pope John Paul II